The Liguilla of the Primera División de México 2010 Bicentenario was a final mini-tournament involving eight teams of the Primera División de México, in an elimination two-legs playoff.

The first leg Final of the Liguilla was on Wednesday May 20, between Santos Laguna against Toluca.

Defending champions Monterrey, were not able to defend their past championship, as they were knocked out in the first round of the "Liguilla" by Pachuca

Teams

As the 18 teams of the 2010 Bicentenario were divided in three groups of six teams, it was determined that the two top of each group advanced to the Liguilla, even though having had a low performance at the general table. Alongside those six teams, the two best teams at the general table of the remaining 12, regardless of their group, advanced to the Liguilla.

1.Best ranked out of the two top of each group.
2.Although having been tied with points and goal difference with América, Morelia scored less goals throughout the season as opposed to América.

Tie-breaking criteria
The Liguilla has a particular tie-breaking criteria: In case of a tie in the aggregate score, the higher seeded team advance.

The exception for this tie-breaking criteria is the final, where the higher seeded team rule is not used. In this case, if the teams remained tied after 90 minutes of play during the second leg of the finals, extra time were used, followed by a penalty shootout if necessary.

Bracket
The Liguilla hade those teams play two games against each other on a home-and-away basis. The winner of each match up was determined by aggregate score.

The teams were seeded one to eight in quarterfinals, and re-seeded one to four in semifinals, depending on their position at the general table of the season. Higher seeded teams play on their home field during the second leg.

Also, the highest seeded can choose when, if Saturday or Sunday, they want to play the second leg. As the rules mentioned that one half of the matches must be on Wednesday/Saturday, and the other in Thursday/Sunday, the rest of the teams must suit on that choice.

1.Advanced by best position on the general table.

Quarter-finals
The quarterfinals were played on May 1 or 2 (first leg) and May 8 or 9 (second leg).

Kickoffs are given in local time (UTC-6).

First leg

Second leg

Semi-finals
The semifinals were played on May 12 (first leg) and May 15 (second leg).

Kickoffs are given in local time (UTC-6).

First leg

Second leg

Final

The first and second legs of the final were played on May 20 (first leg) and May 23 (second leg).

Kickoffs are given in local time (UTC-6).

First leg

Second leg

Goalscorers
4 goals
 Oribe Peralta (Santos Laguna)

3 goals

 Luis Gabriel Rey (Morelia)
 Vicente Matías Vuoso (Santos Laguna)

2 goals

 Diego Novaretti (Toluca)
 Héctor Mancilla (Toluca)
 Carlos Quintero (Santos Laguna)
 Elías Hernández (Morelia)
 Jorge Iván Estrada (Santos Laguna)
 Zinha (Toluca)
 Jared Borgetti (Morelia

1 goal

 Édgar Dueñas (Toluca)
 Fernando Arce (Santos Laguna)
 Marvin Cabrera (Morelia)
 Luis Montes (Pachuca)
 Manuel Pérez (Toluca)
 Walter Jiménez (Santos Laguna)
 Damián Álvarez (Pachuca)
 Damián Manso (Pachuca)
 Jean Beausejour (América)
 Juan Pablo Rodríguez (Santos Laguna)
 Osvaldo Martínez (Monterrey)
 Jorge Enríquez (Guadalajara)
 Omar Bravo (Guadalajara)
 Gabriel Pereyra (Morelia)
 Ismael Íñiguez (UNAM)
 Darío Cvitanich (Pachuca)
 Miguel Layún (América)
 Antonio Ríos (Toluca)
 Edy Germán Brambila (Pachuca)

References

2009–10 Primera División de México season